Oliver Tickell is a British journalist, author and campaigner on health and environment issues, and author of the book Kyoto2 which sets out a blueprint for effective global climate governance. His articles have been published in all the broadsheet newspapers and numerous magazines including New Scientist, New Statesman and The Economist. He is an experienced broadcaster on the BBC home and world services including "Today", "PM", "Costing the Earth", "Farming World" and "Farming Today". He studied physics at Oxford University and is a founding fellow of the Green Economic Institute.

Family

His father was environmentalist and diplomat Sir Crispin Tickell (1930-2022).

Green Party candidate
In 2002, 2006 and 2010 Oliver Tickell was a candidate in elections for Oxford City Council, representing the Green Party, but was not elected. He also stood for the Greens against Boris Johnson in Henley at the 2001 General Election, finishing fifth, with 2.6% of the vote.

Editorship of The Ecologist
Upon his appointment in October 2013 as editor of The Ecologist, Oliver Tickell said:
"I am very excited to being taking on this role. The Resurgence Trust is a fantastic place for The Ecologist to be. I have been reading The Ecologist since the 1980s and am ever-mindful of its values and principles. My aim is to manifest those values in a different media landscape and I particularly want to make the website more interactive so it becomes a focus for ideas and debate serving the green movement."

In January 2014, Private Eye magazine published the following criticism of Tickell:
"Most hacks and news organisations have long blocked or junked rants from the Lockerbie-bombing conspiracy theorist Patrick Haseldine. Not so The Ecologist magazine."

"Oliver Tickell, the new editor, has just published 'the shocking truth' of Lockerbie by the man who styles himself 'Emeritus Professor of Lockerbie Studies'. Haseldine has long claimed that Pan Am 103 was blown up by the apartheid South African government in order to kill an unfortunate Swedish passenger, Bernt Carlsson, the UN Assistant Secretary-General and UN Commissioner for Namibia."

Publications
 Kyoto2: How to Manage the Global Greenhouse, London, Zed Books (July 2008) Hardback:  Paperback:  also published in the US by Palgrave.
 "On a planet 4C hotter, all we can prepare for is extinction: There's no 'adaptation' to such steep warming. We must stop pandering to special interests, and try a new, post-Kyoto strategy" The Guardian, Monday 11 August 2008.
 Article: "Thorium: Not ‘green’, not ‘viable’, and not likely"

References

British environmentalists
British male journalists
Living people
Year of birth missing (living people)